is a 1985 Japanese drama film directed by Mitsuo Yanagimachi. It was screened in the Un Certain Regard section at the 1985 Cannes Film Festival.

Cast
 Kinya Kitaoji as Tatsuo
 Kiwako Taichi as Kimiko
 Norihei Miki as Yamakawa
 Junko Miyashita as Sachiko, Tatsuo's wife
 Ryota Nakamoto as Ryota
 Aiko Morishita as Nursery school teacher
 Rikiya Yasuoka as Toshio
 Jūkei Fujioka as coolie
 Kenzo Kaneko as Kimiko's brother-in-law
 Sachiko Matsushita as Tatsuo's Sister
 Aoi Nakajima as Kimiko's sister
 Gozo Soma as (as Gôzô Sôma)
 Kin Sugai as Tatsuo's Mother
 Masako Yagi as Tatsuo's Sister

Awards
1985 Mainichi Film Concours
Best Actor - Kinya Kitaoji
Best Screenplay - Kenji Nakagami

References

External links

1985 films
1980s Japanese-language films
1985 drama films
Films directed by Mitsuo Yanagimachi
Japanese drama films
Films scored by Toru Takemitsu
1980s Japanese films